Clark–LeClair Stadium is a baseball park located on the campus of East Carolina University in Greenville, North Carolina. It is the home field of the East Carolina Pirates of the American Athletic Conference. The stadium was named after Pirate alumnus and contributor Bill Clark and former Pirates coach Keith LeClair; ECU's current head coach is Cliff Godwin.

The stadium has 3,000 stadium bleacher seats, plus space for several thousand more spectators in "The Jungle."  There are concession and restroom facilities at the stadium, plus a family picnic area. Amenities include the Pirate Club fundraising and hospitality suite and a private suite for the LeClair family. The venue was built with $11 million in private donations.

The playing surface consists of Celebration Bermuda turf with a clay base infield and crushed-brick warning track.  New lights were included in the construction of the stadium that meet all television specifications. Facilities include indoor and outdoor batting cages, a VIP booth, coach's offices, and a player clubhouse, as well as state-of-the-art broadcast facilities.

The stadium is home to the 2007 ECU Invitational and Keith LeClair Classic  The Pirates consistently rank in the top thirty among Division I baseball programs in attendance.

Events 
The stadium hosted the Conference USA Tournament in 2007, won by Rice, and the Regionals of the NCAA Tournament in 2009, 2018, 2019, and 2021.

Facts 
Largest crowd — 6,003 vs UNC on February 23, 2023 won by East Carolina 6-5
First game — ECU vs. Michigan on March 4, 2005, won by East Carolina 2–1.

See also
 List of NCAA Division I baseball venues

References

External links
East Carolina University Athletics – Lewis Field at Clark-LeClair Stadium

East Carolina Pirates baseball
Sports venues in Pitt County, North Carolina
College baseball venues in the United States
Baseball venues in North Carolina
Sports venues completed in 2005
2005 establishments in North Carolina